Fantic Motor is an Italian manufacturer of motorcycles.

History

Fantic Motor began in 1968, manufacturing and exporting enduro motorcycles, mini-bikes and go-karts. Today they continue in the same genre, though the names have changed to dual-sport and motard (supermoto), and they have returned to the US market in 2016, as Fantic USA Inc. Fantic launched in 2015 also new models of electric bikes, the Fat Bike. and has now a complete line of eMTB and commuter electric bikes.

Fantic began exporting to the United Kingdom in 1972, as part of a wave of manufacturers who took advantage of "sixteener laws," legislation that forbade sixteen-year-old motorcyclists from riding motorcycles up to 250 cc, as they had been used to. As a result, European and Japananese manufacturers exported their sporty and lightweight below-50cc engines, which had been common in Europe, to England also. Fantic produced a "sensational chopper moped" and a TI ("Tourismo Internazionale)," both of which became very popular quickly, with the reputation of being some of the fastest mopeds on the market, going as fast as 70 mph.

From the 1970s until the early 1980s, Fantic produced a series of 50cc mopeds called Fantic Motor Lei.
The Fantic Motor motorcycles were first imported into the U.K. in 1972 by Barron Eurotrade Ltd whose headquarters were based at 51 High Street Hornchurch, Essex. The idea of forming the company and importing the Fantic came about because one of the founders saw the 50cc 'Chopper' model publicised in an American motorcycle magazine that his brother in law sent him from the States.
The U.K. market of learner riders had several other makes of what were classed as Mopeds, (Motor and Pedals), but the Fantic T.I. quickly gained popularity with the rapid growth of a dealer network. The six speed gearbox was a strong selling point, and the perky Italian Minarelli 49cc engine proved to be very reliable. Stories of the T.I. model reaching 70 mph were an exaggeration, as only just over 50-55 mph could be achieved, and in the right conditions. The 125cc Chopper model could top 80 mph, as Terence Shea found when the model was first demonstrated to him at the Fantic factory in Barzago
, Italy. He test rode the new 125cc chopper model, reaching a top speed .
The chopper model was the original inspiration which the new U.K. importer saw as very special and distinct for a niche market, and fame grew.
Part of the original marketing and advertising included a Fantic 125cc chopper model being given to comedian Dick Emery. There were many photos of Dick Emery with Terry Shea and Frank Harris of the U.K. importer, and one was blown up very large which showed Terence Shea standing next to the 'bike with his hand on the handlebars with Dick Emery sitting on it.
Another popular model was the 125cc Caballero was for on/off-road, which was for a different sector of the market.
The market for these types of Mopeds only lasted a handful of years.
The official U.K. importers glossy studio photograph of the 125cc Chopper model was taken in London, and Terence Shea and Frank Harris of the Barron Eurotrade importer was taken from Hornchurch to London on a trailer towed by car. There was confusion in central London as to which turn to take at one particular junction on the way to the studio, which resulted in the trailer having to be unhooked and physically turned around in the narrow road and extremely busy area for the correct journey to the studio to be continued, much to the amusement of onlookers.

In the 1980s, Fantic enjoyed success in the Observed trials world championships, taking three titles as well as seven wins at the prestigious Scottish Six Days Trial.

In October 2020, Fantic bought Minarelli from Yamaha.

Racing

Grand Prix motorcycle
In the 2005 season, Fantic competed in the 250cc championship with a team called Scuderia Fantic Motor GP.

Moto2 sponsorship
In the 2023 season, Fantic Motor competes in the Moto2 world championship but is the main sponsor of the VR46 Racing Team with its two riders, Celestino Vietti and Borja Gómez.

See also 

List of Italian companies
List of motorcycle manufacturers

Notes

External links
Fantic Motor 2009 range
Fantic Motor, Italy
Fantic Motor, Portugal

Italian brands
Motorcycle manufacturers of Italy
Vehicle manufacturing companies established in 1968
Italian companies established in 1968
Companies based in Veneto